Bekdemirler can refer to:

 Bekdemirler, Harmancık
 Bekdemirler, Mudurnu